The Astor family achieved prominence in business, society, and politics in the United States and the United Kingdom during the 19th and 20th centuries. With ancestral roots in the Italian and Swiss Alps,
the Astors settled in Germany, first appearing in North America in the 18th century with John Jacob Astor, one of the wealthiest people in history.

Founding family members

John Jacob Astor (born Johann Jakob Astor) was the youngest of four sons born to Johann Jacob Astor (1724–1816) and Maria Magdalena vom Berg (1730–1764).

The Astor family can trace their ancestry back to Giovan Asdour (1595–1668) and Gretta Ursula Asdour (1589–). Giovan was born in Chiavenna, Italy, and died in Zürich, Switzerland. Their son, Hans Pieter Asdor, was born in Switzerland and died in Nußloch.

John Jacob and his brother George left Germany and moved to London in 1778. There, they established a flute making company. In 1783, John Jacob left for Baltimore, Maryland, leaving his brother in charge of the London business, and was active first as a dealer in woodwind instruments, then in New York as a merchant in opium, furs, pianos, and real estate. After moving to New York, John met and married Sarah Cox Todd (1762–1842). She worked alongside her husband as a consultant, and was accused of witchcraft after her success with the company in 1817. The accusations never led to legal action. They had eight children, including John Jacob Astor Jr. (1791–1869) and real estate businessman William Backhouse Astor Sr. (1792–1875).

John Jacob's fur trading company established a Columbia River trading post at Fort Astoria in 1811, the first United States community on the Pacific coast. He financed the overland Astor Expedition in 1810–1812 to reach the outpost, which was in the then-disputed Oregon Country. Control of Fort Astoria played a key role in English and American territorial claims on the region.

John and George's brother Henry (born Heinrich) (1754–1833) also emigrated to America. Henry was a horse racing enthusiast, and purchased a thoroughbred named Messenger, who had been brought from England to America in 1788. The horse became the founding sire of all Standardbred horses in the United States today.

The third brother Melchior remained in Germany.

During the 19th century, the Astors became one of the wealthiest families in the United States. Toward the end of that century, some of the family moved to England and achieved high prominence there. During the 20th century, the number of American Astors began to decline, but their legacy lives on in their many public works including the New York Public Library. English descendants of the Astors hold two hereditary peerages: Viscount Astor and Baron Astor of Hever.

While many of Astor members joined the Episcopal Church, John Jacob Astor remained a member of the Reformed congregation to his death.

Family namesake places
For many years, the members of the Astor family were known as "the landlords of New York". Their New York City namesakes are the famous Waldorf-Astoria Hotel, an Astor Row, Astor Court, Astor Place, and Astor Avenue in the Bronx, where the Astors stabled horses. The neighborhood of Astoria, Queens, was renamed to incite John Jacob Astor to invest there.

Beyond New York City, the Astor family name is imprinted in a great deal of United States history and geography. Astor Street, in Chicago's landmark Gold Coast district, is named after John Jacob Astor. There are towns of Astor in the states of Florida, Georgia, Iowa, and Kansas and there are Astorias in Illinois, Missouri, and Oregon. In Astoria, Oregon, the primary elementary school is called John Jacob Astor Elementary and the city is home to the Astoria Column.

There is a neighborhood called Astor Park just south of downtown Green Bay, Wisconsin. At the heart of this neighborhood is a park (also called "Astor Park"); the Astor family donated this land for the building of a trade school.

The Astors were also prominent on Mackinac Island, Michigan, and Newport, Rhode Island, with their summer house, Beechwood. At Grand Hotel on Mackinac Island, there are the Lord and Lady Astor Suites; the hotel salon is called Astor's. There is even a Hostel in York, England called The Astor. In addition, a dormitory at St. George's School in Newport, Rhode Island, bears Astor's name.

The Danubius Hotel Astoria in the center of Pest, Budapest, Hungary, opened in 1914, was given its name by the original hotel owners and Mihály Gellér, the first General Manager of the hotel, who formerly worked for the Waldorf-Astoria Hotel in New York.  In Shanghai, China there is the Astor House Hotel in the Bund.

Mount Astor in Antarctica was named after Vincent Astor by the explorer Richard Evelyn Byrd.

Astor family tree 

John Jacob Astor Sr. (1763–1848)
Magdalena Astor (1788–1832)
 Charles Astor Bristed Sr. (1820–1874)
William Backhouse Astor Sr. (1792–1875)
Emily Astor (1819–1841)
 Margaret Astor "Maddie" Ward (1838–1875)
John Armstrong Chaloner (1862–1935)
Winthrop Astor Chanler (1863–1926)
 Theodore Chanler (1902–1961)
William Astor "Willie" Chanler Sr. (1867–1934)
Lewis Stuyvesant Chanler Sr. (1869–1942)
Margaret Chanler Aldrich (1870–1963)
 Robert Winthrop Chanler (1872–1930)
John Jacob Astor III (1822–1890)
William Waldorf Astor I (1848–1919)
Waldorf Astor (1879–1952)
William Waldorf "Bill" Astor II (1907–1966)
William Waldorf Astor III (born 1951)
Flora Katherine Astor (born 1976)
William Waldorf "Will" Astor IV (born 1979)
 James Jacob Astor (born 1981)
Nancy Phyllis Louise Astor, Countess of Ancaster (1909–1975)
 Jane Heathcote-Drummond-Willoughby, 28th Baroness Willoughby de Eresby (born 1938)
Francis David Langhorne Astor (1912–2001)
Michael Langhorne Astor (1916–1980)
 John Jacob "Jakie" Astor VII (1918–2000)
The Hon. Pauline Astor (1880–1972)
 Rachel Pauline Spender-Clay, Lady Bowes-Lyon (1907–1996)
Davina Katherine Bowes-Lyon, Countess of Stair (1930–2017)
 John Dalrymple, 14th Earl of Stair (born 1961)
 Simon Bowes-Lyon (born 1932)
 John Jacob Astor V (1886–1971)
Gavin Astor (1918–1984)
 John Jacob "Johnny" Astor VIII (born 1946)
 John Astor (1923–1987)
Mary Alida Astor (1826–1881)
 Margaret Laura Astor Carey (1853–1911)
 Louis Zborowski (1895–1924)
 William Backhouse Astor Jr. (1829–1892)
Emily Astor (1854–1881)
 James Laurens Van Alen (1878–1927)
 Jimmy Van Alen (1902–1991)
 Louise Astor Van Alen (1910–1997)
Helen Schermerhorn Astor (1855–1893)
 James Roosevelt "Tadd" Roosevelt Jr. (1879–1958)
Carrie Astor Wilson (1861–1948)
 Marshall Orme Wilson Jr. (1885–1966)
 John Jacob "Jack" Astor IV (1864–1912)
William Vincent Astor (1891–1959)
Ava Alice Muriel Astor (1902–1956)
Prince Ivan Sergeyevich Obolensky (1925–2019)
Marina Ivanovna Obolensky (born 1951)
Ivan Ivanovich Obolensky (born 1952)
David Ivanovich Obolensky (born 1953)
Natalya Elizabeth Davidovna Obolensky (born 1984)
Octavia Willing Davidovna Obolensky (born 1989)
Sergei Ivanovich Obolensky (born 1960)
Alexander Vasily Sergeyevich Obolensky (born 1994)
Christopher Chapman Sergeyevich Obolensky (born 1999)
 Sylvia Sergeyevna Obolensky (1931–1997)
 John Jacob "Jakey" Astor VI (1912–1992)
Mary Jacqueline Astor (born 1949)
Nicholas Astor Drexel (born 1987)
 Dorothea Astor 1795–1874)
Eliza Astor Langdon (1818–1896)
 Matthew Astor Wilks (1844–1926)
 Louisa Dorothea Langdon (1820–1894)
DeLancey Astor Kane (1844–1915)
S. Nicholson Kane (1846–1906)
John Innes Kane (1850–1913)
Emily Astor Kane (1854–1932)
Peter Augustus Jay (1877–1933)
Susan Mary Jay (1918–2004)
Sybil Kent Kane (1856–1946)
Woodbury Kane (1859–1905)

Members by birth order

John Jacob Astor Sr. (1763–1848)
William Backhouse Astor Sr. (1792–1875)
Charles Astor Bristed Sr. (1820–1874)
John Jacob Astor III (1822–1890)
William Backhouse Astor Jr. (1829–1892)
Matthew Astor Wilks (1844–1926)
DeLancey Astor Kane (1844–1915)
S. Nicholson Kane (1846–1906)
William Waldorf Astor I (1848–1919)
John Innes Kane (1850–1913)
Sybil Kent Kane (1856–1946)
Woodbury Kane (1859–1905)
Carrie Astor Wilson (1861–1948)
John Armstrong Chaloner (1862–1935)
Winthrop Astor Chanler (1863–1926)
John Jacob "Jack" Astor IV (1864–1912, died in the sinking of the Titanic)
William Astor "Willie" Chanler Sr. (1867–1934)
Lewis Stuyvesant Chanler Sr. (1869–1942)
Margaret Chanler Aldrich (1870–1963)
Robert Winthrop Chanler (1872–1930)
Peter Augustus Jay (1877–1933)
Waldorf Astor (1879–1952)
James Roosevelt "Tadd" Roosevelt Jr. (1879–1958)
Marshall Orme Wilson Jr. (1885–1966)
John Jacob Astor V (1886–1971)
William Vincent Astor (1891–1959)
Louis Zborowski (1895–1924)
Theodore Chanler (1902–1961)
Ava Alice Muriel Astor (1902–1956)
Jimmy Van Alen (1902–1991)
William Waldorf "Bill" Astor II (1907–1966)
Francis David Langhorne Astor (1912–2001)
John Jacob "Jakey" Astor VI (1912–1992)
Michael Langhorne Astor (1916–1980)
Susan Mary Jay (1918–2004)
John Jacob "Jakie" Astor VII (1918–2000)
Gavin Astor (1918–1984)
John Astor (1923–1987)
Prince Ivan Sergeyevich Obolensky (1925–2019)
Princess Sylvia Sergeyevna Obolensky (1931–1997)
Simon Bowes-Lyon (born 1932)
Jane Heathcote-Drummond-Willoughby, 28th Baroness Willoughby de Eresby (born 1938)
John Jacob "Johnny" Astor VIII (born 1946)
William Waldorf Astor III (born 1951)
John Dalrymple, 14th Earl of Stair (born 1961)

Spouses by birth order
Vincent Rumpff (1789–1867): husband of Eliza Astor
Franklin Hughes Delano (1813–1893): husband of Laura Eugenia Astor
Samuel Cutler "Sam" Ward (1814–1884): husband of Emily Astor
John Winthrop Chanler (1826–1877): husband and widower of Margaret Astor Ward
Caroline Webster Schermerhorn (1830–1908): widow of William Backhouse Astor Jr.
James John Van Alen (1848–1923): husband and widower of Emily Astor
Augustus Jay (1850–1919): husband of Emily Astor Kane
James Roosevelt "Rosey" Roosevelt Sr. (1854–1927): husband and widower of Helen Schermerhorn Astor
Count William Eliot Morris Zborowski (1858–1903): 2nd husband of Margaret Laura Astor Carey
Marshall Orme Wilson (1860–1926): husband of Caroline Schermerhorn Astor
John Jay Chapman (1862–1933): husband of Elizabeth Astor Winthrop Chanler
Richard Aldrich (1863–1937): husband of Margaret Livingston Chanler
Amélie Louise Rives (1863–1945): wife of John Armstrong Chaloner
Ava Lowle Willing (1868–1958): 1st wife of John Jacob "Jack" Astor IV
Harriet Sylvia Ann Howland Green(1871–1951): wife and widow of Matthew Astor Wilks
Natalina Cavalieri (1874–1944): 2nd wife of Robert Winthrop Chanler
Herbert Henry Spender-Clay (1875–1937): husband of Pauline Astor
Margaret Louise Post (1876–1969): wife and widow of James Laurens Van Alen
Robert Joseph Collier (1876–1918): husband of Sarah Steward Van Alen
Nancy Witcher Langhorne (1879–1964): widow of Waldorf Astor, first female British MP to sit in the house of commons.
Minnie W. Collins (1880–1946): widow of William Astor "Willie" Chanler
Julia Lynch Olin (1882–1961): 2nd wife and widow of Lewis Stuyvesant Chanler
Theodore Douglas Robinson (1883–1934): husband of Helen Rebecca Roosevelt
Lawrence Grant White (1887–1956): husband of Laura Astor Chanler
Violet Mary Elliot-Murray-Kynynmound (1889–1965): wife of John Jacob Astor V
Prince Sergei Platonovich Obolensky Neledinsky-Meletzky (1890–1978), 1st husband of Ava Alice Muriel Astor
Helen Dinsmore Huntington (1893–1976): 1st wife and widow of William Vincent Astor
Madeleine Talmage Force (1893–1940): 2nd wife and widow of John Jacob "Jack" Astor IV
Louis Bancel LaFarge (1900–1989): husband and widower of Hester Alida Emmet
Roberta Brooke Russell (1902–2007): 3rd wife and widow of William Vincent Astor
The Hon. Sir David Bowes Lyon (1902–1961): husband of Rachel Pauline Spender-Clay
Mary Benedict "Minnie" Cushing (1906–1978): 2nd wife of William Vincent Astor
John Aylmer Dalrymple, 13th Earl of Stair (1906-1996): husband of Davina Katherine Bowes-Lyon
Gilbert James Heathcote-Drummond-Willoughby, 3rd Earl of Ancaster (1907–1983): husband and widower of Nancy Phyllis Louise Astor
Joseph Wright Alsop V (1910–1989): 2nd husband of Susan Mary Jay
Irene Violet Freesia Janet Augusta Haig (1919–2001): widow of Gavin Astor
Hon. Sarah Kathleen Elinor Norton (1920–2013): 1st wife of William Waldorf "Bill" Astor II
Janet Bronwen Alun Pugh (1930–2017): 3rd wife and widow of William Waldorf "Bill" Astor II
Roderick McEwen (1932–1982): husband of Romana von Hofmannsthal
Annabel Lucy Veronica Jones (born 1948): wife of William Waldorf Astor III, mother-in-law of British PM David Cameron
Elizabeth Constance "Liz" Mackintosh (born 1950): 2nd wife of John Jacob "Johnny" Astor VIII
Jools Miles Holland (born 1958): 2nd husband of Christabel Mary McEwen
Charles Henry Gordon-Lennox, 11th Duke of Richmond (born 1955): husband of Janet Elizabeth Astor
Edward Richard Lambton, 7th Earl of Durham (born 1961): 1st husband of Christabel Mary McEwen
Laura Rose Parker Bowles (born 1978): wife of Harry Marcus George Lopes

Lines of Succession to the Family Titles 

Both in the Peerage of the United Kingdom, the titles
 Viscount Astor, of Hever Castle in the County of Kent (1917), with subsidiary title  Baron Astor, of Hever Castle in the County of Kent (1916), and  Baron Astor of Hever, of Hever Castle in the County of Kent (1956), were granted with the standard remainder to the legitimate male heirs of the bodies of the original grantees.

Both of the current titleholders continue to sit in the House of Lords following the expulsion of the majority of the hereditary peers by the House of Lords Act 1999.

  The Right Hon. William Waldorf Astor, 1st Viscount Astor (1848–1919)
  The Right Hon. Waldorf Astor, 2nd Viscount Astor, DL (1879–1952)
  The Right Hon. William Waldorf Astor, 3rd Viscount Astor (1907–1966)
  The Right Hon. William Waldorf Astor, 4th Viscount Astor (b. 1951)
 (1) The Hon. William Waldorf Astor (b. 1979)
 (2) William Waldorf Astor (b. 2012)
 (3) Conrad Charles Astor (b. 2016)
 (4) The Hon. James Jacob Astor (b. 1981)
 The Hon. Francis David Langhorne Astor, CH (1912–2001)
 (5) Richard David Langhorne Astor (b. 1955)
 (6) Thomas Robert Langhorne Astor (b. 1962)
 The Hon. Michael Langhorne Astor (1916–1980)
 (7) David Waldorf Astor (b. 1943)
 (8) Henry Waldorf Astor (b. 1969)
 (9) George Astor (b. 1998)
 (10) Jakie Astor (b. 2003)
 (11) Charles Edgar Spence Astor (b. 2007)
 (12) Michael Allstar Astor (b. 2009)
 (13) Thomas Ludovic David Astor (b. 1972)
 (14) Frederick Michael Astor (b. 2003)
 (15) Vincent David Astor (b. 2009)
 (16) James Colonsay Langhorne Astor (b. 1945)
 (17) Tobias Michael de Chazal Astor (b. 1980)
 (18) Griffith Charles William Astor (b. 2016)
 Major The Hon. Sir John Jacob Astor, MBE, ERD (1918–2000)
 (19) Michael Ramon Langhorne Astor (b. 1946)
 (20) James Edward Astor (b. 1976)
  The Right Hon. Lt-Col John Jacob Astor, 1st Baron Astor of Hever, DL (1886–1971)
  The Right Hon. Gavin Astor, 2nd Baron Astor of Hever (1918–1984)
 (21)  The Right Hon. John Jacob Astor, 3rd Baron Astor of Hever, PC, DL (b. 1946)
 (1, 22) The Hon. Charles Gavin John Astor (b. 1990)
 (2, 23) The Hon. Philip Douglas Paul Astor (b. 1959)
 Lt-Col The Hon. Hugh Waldorf Astor (1920–1999)
 (3, 24) Robert Hugh Astor (b. 1958)
 (4, 25) Nicholas Louis Robert Astor (b. 1996)
 (5, 26) Jonathan Hugh Astor (b. 1997)
 (6, 27) James Alexander Waldorf Astor (b. 1965)
 (7, 28) Alexander Richard Astor (b. 2000)
 The Hon. John Astor (1923–1987)
 John Richard Astor (1953–2016)
 (8, 29) Charles John Astor (b. 1982)
 (9, 30) George David Astor (b. 1958)
 (10, 31) Thomas David Astor (b. 1987)

Astor Family Network

Associates

James J. Van Alen
Waheed Alli
George Boldt
Richard E. Byrd
William Francis Casey
Geoffrey Dawson
Albert Gallatin
William Haley
Lord Frederick Spencer Hamilton
W. Averell Harriman
Wilson Price Hunt
Joseph LaBarge
Alexander MacKay
Ward McAllister
Duncan McDougall
Donald McKenzie
Charles A. Platt
Robert Stuart

Businesses

American Fur Company
Astor Court Apartment
Bull's Head Tavern
Gallatin National Bank 
Hotel New Netherland
John Jacob Astor & Company
Mohawk & Hudson Railroad
Newsweek
The Observer
OKA Direct
Pall Mall Gazette
Park Hotel
Silvergate Media
South West Company
St. Regis Hotel
The Times of London
Waldorf-Astoria (1893–1929)
Waldorf Hotel

Philanthropy and non-profit organizations

Astor of Hever Trust
Astor Court
Astor Home for Children
Astor Library
Astor, Florida
Brooke Astor Fund for New York City Education
Cliveden Set
Ferncliff Forest
Florida Yacht Club
French Heroes Lafayette Memorial Fund
Koestler Trust
New York Cancer Hospital
Rothermere American Institute
St. Margaret's Home
Vincent Astor Foundation

Estates and historic sites

130 East 80th Street House
The Apthorp
Astor Fur Warehouse
Astor Row
Beaulieu House
Beechwood
Cliveden
Ferncliff Farm
Ferry Reach 
Ginge Manor
Graham Court
Hatley Park 
Hellgate 
Hever Castle
Knickerbocker Building
Manor House (Sutton Courtenay)
Mrs. William B. Astor House
Nuits (Irvington, New York)
Rokeby (Barrytown, New York)
Steen Valetje 
Two Temple Place

References

External links 

 The Astor Family Papers 1719-1943 at the New York Historical Society
 Cracroft's Peerage page 
 The Astor Family Business

 
Families of German ancestry
Business families of the United States
Political families of the United Kingdom
German-American history
Episcopalian families
British families
English families
American landlords